Ngala Lapan is a Papua New Guinean rugby league player who represented Papua New Guinea national rugby league team, including in Rugby League World Cup matches.

References

Possibly living people
Year of birth missing
Papua New Guinean rugby league players
Papua New Guinea national rugby league team captains
Papua New Guinea national rugby league team players
Rugby league halfbacks